Guy Albert Trottier (April 1, 1941 – June 19, 2014) was a Canadian professional ice hockey player who played 115 games in the National Hockey League and 174 games in the World Hockey Association between 1969 and 1975. He played for the New York Rangers, Toronto Maple Leafs, Ottawa Nationals, Toronto Toros, Michigan Stags and Baltimore Blades.

Playing career
Trottier played junior and senior hockey in the Hull-Ottawa area before signing with the Knoxville Knights of the Eastern Hockey League in 1963. In 1963–64, Trottier was traded twice, to the Philadelphia Ramblers of the EHL and the Port Huron Flags of the International Hockey League, totaling 33 goals and 31 assists in 69 games. During the off-season, he was traded to the IHL's Dayton Gems, with whom he played the next three years. In 201 games with Dayton, he scored 185 goals and registered 170 assists. He led the IHL in playoff goals (10), assists (9) and points (19) in the 1966 Turner Cup playoffs, and led the IHL with 71 goals in 1966–67. He was a second-team IHL All-Star in 1964–65 and 1965–66, and a first-team All-Star in 1966–67.

In 1967, Trottier signed with the Buffalo Bisons of the American Hockey League. He led the AHL in goal scoring with 45 in 1968–69 and 55 in the Bisons' final season, 1969–70. In December 1968 the New York Rangers purchased his contract, and he appeared in two NHL games. In June 1970, the Maple Leafs claimed him in the Intra-League Draft. He scored 28 goals and 17 assists in 113 games with the Leafs.

In 1972, the Dayton Arrows of the WHA claimed Trottier in the league's first General Player Draft. Later that year, his rights were traded to Ottawa. He scored 26 goals with the Nationals in 1972–73, and 27 more in 1973–74, after the team moved to Toronto. In November 1974, the Toros traded him to the Michigan Stags. He finished out the season with Dayton of the IHL. After spending the 1975–76 season as playing coach of the Buffalo Norsemen of the North American Hockey League, he retired. He also coached the Hull Olympiques for part of the 1977–78 season.

Post-playing career
In 2009, Trottier was hired by the Dayton Gems of the International Hockey League as director of hockey operations.

He died of cancer at a hospice in Dayton, Ohio at the age of 73 in 2014.

Career statistics

Regular season and playoffs

References

External links
 

1941 births
2014 deaths
Baltimore Blades players
Buffalo Bisons (AHL) players
Buffalo Norsemen players
Canadian ice hockey coaches
Canadian ice hockey right wingers
Dayton Gems players
Hull Olympiques coaches
Ice hockey people from Gatineau
Knoxville Knights players
Michigan Stags players
New York Rangers players
North American Hockey League (1973–1977) coaches
Ottawa Nationals players
Philadelphia Ramblers players
Port Huron Flags players
Toronto Maple Leafs players
Toronto Toros players